The 1989 Purefoods Hotdogs season was the 2nd season of the franchise in the Philippine Basketball Association (PBA).

Transactions

Trades

Occurrences
Former Presto coach Baby Dalupan moved over to coach the Purefoods Hotdogs, replacing Cris Calilan, who return to his position as assistant coach. The Maestro began coaching the Hotdogs in their second game in the semifinal round of the Open Conference. 

During the third conference, their import Dexter Shouse left the team on a crucial stages in the semifinals with a playoff game against Añejo for the second finals berth looms. Shouse signed a contract to play in the NBA and was banned by the PBA for a repeat of his similar actions in the league, leaving his team first with Shell in 1987.

Notable dates
May 2: Alvin Patrimonio scored 40 points as Purefoods won for the first time over San Miguel in four meetings in the Open Conference via 126-115 victory.

July 18: Purefoods avenged their first round elimination loss to San Miguel by overpowering the Beermen, 125-115, and tied them on top of the standings with seven wins and two losses. 

July 23: The Hotdogs' winning streak reach to seven games in a 117-106 victory over Formula Shell and close out the eliminations on top with nine wins and two losses.  

October 3: Dexter Shouse scored 38 points, 21 in the first quarter, and Jerry Codinera made an all-time record 11 shot blocks as the Hotdogs gave the San Miguel Beermen their worst beating in a 126-94 rout in both teams' first game in the Reinforced Conference.

November 5: Dindo Pumaren converted on a 20-foot jumper with two seconds left to lift the Hotdogs to a 121-119 overtime win over San Miguel Beermen for their seventh win in 11 games, snapping a three-game slump and regain solo leadership in the semifinal round. 

November 9: Purefoods scored their third straight win in the semifinals by winning against Alaska, 116-111, to remain on top of the standings with nine wins and four losses.

Roster

Addition

Imports

Win–loss record

Team Milestones

External links
Purefoods Basketball: Purefoods Current News and Updates

References

Purefoods
Magnolia Hotshots seasons